Blood on Blood is the seventeenth studio album by the German heavy metal band Running Wild, their first album in five years, since 2016's Rapid Foray. It was released by Steamhammer Records on 29 October 2021.

On 6 December 2019, an EP titled Crossing the Blades was released as an early hint for a new album. Two more singles were released in advance, closer to the album's release date; "Diamonds & Pearls" on 13 August 2021 and "The Shellback" on 24 September 2021.

Critical reception

Rock Hard magazine praised Blood on Blood, saying that the album "should really stir up the German album charts soon. Every bet!". That promise is fulfilled with the album reaching #8 on the German album charts.

Metal Hammer has noted highlight tracks from the album including "the solid rock ballad 'One Night One Day' as well as the ten-minute bouncer 'The Iron Times 1618-1648', in which Rolf [Kasparek] epically addresses the Thirty Years' War."

Track listing

Crossing the Blades promotional EP contains an earlier recording of the EP's title track and the bonus tracks of the Japan edition of Blood on Blood.

Personnel
 Rolf Kasparek – vocals, lead and rhythm guitars, additional bass
 Peter Jordan – lead guitars
 Ole Hempelmann – bass
 Michael Wolpers – drums

Production
 Rolf Kasparek – producer, recording, mixing, photography
 Timetools Mastering – mastering
 Jens Reinhold – artwork, layout

Charts

References

External links
 Official website for the album

2021 albums
Running Wild (band) albums
SPV/Steamhammer albums